The choroid glomus or glomus choroideum, is an enlargement of the choroid plexus located in the atrium of each lateral ventricle. They are commonly calcified in adults and can easily be seen as a bright tufts on CT imaging. Their main purpose is for the secretion of cerebrospinal fluid (CSF).

References

Central nervous system